Jordan Andrew Thompson (born 3 January 1997) is a Northern Irish professional footballer who plays as a midfielder for Stoke City and the Northern Ireland national team. 

Thompson began his career with Rangers after progressing through the youth teams at Manchester United. He spent time out on loan at Airdrieonians, Raith Rovers and Livingston before he joined EFL League One side Blackpool in June 2018. Thompson spent a year-and-a-half at Bloomfield Road and moved on to Stoke City in January 2020.

Early life
Thompson grew up in Belfast, Northern Ireland, supporting Rangers.

Club career

Rangers
Thompson started his career at Manchester United, spending four years at the club's academy but was unable to break into the first team and was released in the summer of 2015. He then  joined Rangers on trial after a meeting with coach Ian Durrant. After impressing then-manager Mark Warburton, Thompson signed a two-year contract. He made his professional debut for Rangers in a 4–0 win against Alloa Athletic on 7 November 2015. On 23 February 2016, Thompson joined Scottish League One side Airdrieonians on a 28-day emergency loan and this loan was later extended to the end of the 2015–16 season. Thompson played seven times for Airdrieonians, scoring once in 3–1 win at Cowdenbeath.

After making his first appearance for Rangers in the 2016–17 season, against East Stirlingshire in the Scottish League Cup on 22 July, Thompson joined Scottish Championship side Raith Rovers on loan, on 5 August 2016 until January 2017. On 11 January 2017 he extended his contract with Rangers until 2018 and his loan at Raith Rovers until he end of the season. Thompson played 32 times for Raith in 2016–17 and was unable to help them avoid relegation after they lost the relegation play-off on penalties to Brechin City.

In January 2018, Thompson signed on loan for Scottish Championship side Livingston until the end of the 2017–18 season. Thompson made 15 appearances for Livi helping them gain promotion to the Scottish Premiership via the play-offs.

Blackpool
Thompson was released by Rangers in June 2018 and he then signed a two-year contract with EFL League One club Blackpool. Thompson played 45 times for Blackpool in 2018–19 as the team finished in 10th position. Thompson and Blackpool began the 2019–20 season in good form, with Thompson scoring a "wonderful" goal in a 2–1 win against Lincoln City. In January 2020 Blackpool manager Simon Grayson revealed that Thompson had attracted the attentions of Championship clubs.

Stoke City
Thompson joined EFL Championship club Stoke City on 17 January 2020 for an undisclosed fee. Thompson had previously worked with manager Michael O'Neill at International level with Northern Ireland. Thompson made 15 appearances for Stoke in 2019–20, helping the team avoid relegation and finish in 15th place. He scored his first goal for Stoke in a 3–1 defeat to Tottenham Hotspur in the EFL Cup on 23 December 2020. In the 2020–21 season Thompson, formed a midfield partnership alongside John Obi Mikel, making 40 appearances. Thompson struggled with injuries in 2021–22, undergoing knee surgery in December 2021 and damaging ankle ligaments in April 2022. In April 2022, Thompson signed a new two-year contract with Stoke keeping him contracted until June 2024.

International career
Thompson has represented Northern Ireland at various age levels. He made his international debut in May 2018. He started for the first time in a friendly against Luxembourg at Windsor Park on 5 September 2019.

Career statistics

Club

International
Source:

Honours
Individual
SuperCupNI (senior) Player of the Tournament: 2014

References

External links

1997 births
Living people
Association football midfielders
Association footballers from Northern Ireland
Northern Ireland youth international footballers
Northern Ireland under-21 international footballers
Manchester United F.C. players
Rangers F.C. players
Raith Rovers F.C. players
Airdrieonians F.C. players
Livingston F.C. players
Blackpool F.C. players
Stoke City F.C. players
Scottish Professional Football League players
Northern Ireland international footballers
English Football League players